Tetramorium nazgul is a species of Myrmicine ant native to Analalava, Ambohijanahary, and the Zombitse-Vohibasia National Park, Madagascar.  The species is characterized by long, thin, propodeal spines.  Its body is covered in a multitude of long hairs.  General coloration is dark brown or black, with lighter coloration on the legs.  The species is commonly found in leaf litter in tropical dry forests and montane rainforests, typically around elevations of 700 to 1,100 meters.  It was named after the Nazgûl from J. R. R. Tolkien's The Lord of the Rings.

References

External links
 
 
 
 Tetramorium nazgul at AntWiki

nazgul
Insects of Madagascar
Insects described in 2012
Organisms named after Tolkien and his works